Juana Beatriz Gutierrez (born 1932) is an American political activist and community organizer.

Life and career

Gutierrez was born in Mexico. In 1954, she married Ricardo Gutierrez and in 1956 the couple moved to Los Angeles where they had nine children. They lived in Los Angeles for forty-three years.

She founded Madres de Este Los Angeles Santa Isabel (MELASI) which defeated a proposal to build a prison near her home, and later a proposal to place a toxic dump and oil pipeline nearby. This organization, composed of neighborhood residents of Vernon in East Los Angeles, have worked together to ensure that their community obtains safe conditions to live in. According to the National Women's History Project, MELASI also helped with the problems of "crime, unemployment, failing schools, dangerous working conditions, and pesticide-filled foods".  They established a scholarship fund, giving more than $300,000 to local students, and a water conservation program that employed 22 people and built a community garden. Further, MELASI also partnered with other grassroots organizations like the Greenpeace and the National Resources Defense Council to promote environmental well-being among the community.

Legacy

Gutierrez's work has been featured in the former Soviet Union, Australia, and Europe. Her archives are in the Urban Archive Collection at the University Library at California State University, Northridge.

Notes

1932 births
Living people